Tean is a large village in Staffordshire, England. The River Tean runs through the village, heading east towards Uttoxeter. Population details for the 2011 census can be found under Checkley.

The village is itself composed of two villages: Upper Tean (the larger of the two) and Lower Tean. It is part of the Checkley ward within the Staffordshire Moorlands district. The surrounding area is predominantly farming / rural, and it is a short drive into the southern edge of the Peak District.

The Heath House, a Gothic Revival mansion and estate, is located to the east of the village. The village also contains an historic tape mill (now converted into apartments / flats).

There are a number of pubs & shops, a doctors' surgery, nurseries, a village hall (Greatwood Hall), three churches, and a small park. There is free car parking signposted off one end of the High Street (between the two pubs).

Major employers in the area include Alton Towers, JCB, Toyota, and Fox's Biscuits.

History

The village was within the ancient Hundred of Totmonslow as Tene in the Domesday Book survey of 1086, when it had 15 households.

In the 18th century, a tape weaving company was established in the village by John and Nathaniel Philips: in 1747 they bought Tean Hall, a half-timbered building in Upper Tean built in 1613, and it became a base for their company. Tapes were at first produced in tape-weavers' cottages, using looms provided by the company. From the early 19th century, factories, housing steam-powered Jacquard looms, were built in the village; the factories, adjacent to Tean Hall, were known as Tean Hall Mills.

Manufacturing has ceased in Tean, but the mill buildings, now converted into apartments / flats, remain a notable feature of Upper Tean High Street.

Transport
The village is well positioned for transport, with road / bus connections east to Uttoxeter & Derby, and west to Stoke.

Tean lies at the crossroads of the A522 road between Cheadle, Staffordshire and Uttoxeter, and the road from Blythe Bridge to Rocester. It is a 10-minute drive east or west to join the main A50 at either Uttoxeter or Blythe Bridge. From the A50 there are direct links to both the M1 and M6.

The village is approx. 50 minutes from both Manchester and East Midlands airports, and 1 hour 10 minutes from Birmingham airport.

The village was served by Tean railway station at Totmonslow (to the west of the village) until its closure in 1953. The nearest railway stations now are Blythe Bridge & Uttoxeter - both branch line - or Derby & Stoke - for main lines.

First Bus and D&G Buses serve the village.

Education
There are two primary schools in Tean: St Thomas' Roman Catholic and Greatwood; with most children progressing to secondary schools in either Cheadle or Uttoxeter. Other nearby secondary schools include: Denstone / Abbotsholme (Rocester) / JCB Academy (Rocester) / Blythe Bridge.

See also 
Listed buildings in Checkley
J. & N. Philips

References

External links

 Some photographs of Tean buildings
 Great Wood Hall

Villages in Staffordshire
Staffordshire Moorlands